Rakahouka is a community in the Southland region of New Zealand's South Island.  It is located in a fertile farming area on the Southland Plains just south of the Makarewa River.  The nearest major city, Invercargill, is approximately 15 km to the southwest, and nearby villages include Grove Bush and Mabel Bush to the north, Woodlands to the southeast, and Myross Bush and Roslyn Bush to the southwest.

, which links Lorneville and Dacre, runs through Rakahouka.

Populated places in Southland, New Zealand